Richard Kovacs (May 5, 1884 – December 29, 1950) was a physician who pioneered diathermy as a therapy. In 1945, he was lamenting the rapid disappearance of American spas.

Writings
German Spas: Neuenahr, Wiesbaden, Baden-Baden as Seen by the Travel Study Club of American Physicians (1926)
Accidental Injuries in Office Practice (1933) in the Journal of the American Medical Association

References

American rehabilitation physicians
1884 births
1950 deaths